Neil Adams (born 26 May 1982 in Birmingham, United Kingdom) is an English senior ice hockey Forward.

Playing career

Adams has spent most of his career playing in the EPIHL, for teams such as Solihull Barons, Romford Raiders and Guildford Flames. From the age of 14 Adams also represented Great Britain at the junior level. Adams' most successful season statistically to date was the 2007/08 season he spent in the ENIHL with Solihull. This is the only time he had played a season in British ice hockeys lowest senior league.

Career stats

References

External links

1982 births
Living people
English ice hockey forwards
Sportspeople from Birmingham, West Midlands